Red wine headache ("RWH") is a headache often accompanied by nausea and flushing that occurs after consuming  red wine in susceptible individuals. White wine headaches have been less commonly reported.

Sulfites 
Many wines contain a warning label about sulfites, and some people believe that sulfites are the cause of RWH and other allergic and pseudoallergic reactions. However, this may not be the case. Dried fruit and processed foods like lunch meat have more sulfites than red wine.  Reactions to sulfites are not considered a "true allergy" and reactions more commonly occur in persons with asthma and may manifest themselves in difficulty breathing or skin reactions, rather than headache. 

Some wines may be exempt from including a sulfite warning. Wines that have under 10mg/L of sulfites do not need to be labeled that they contain sulfites. This includes added and natural sulfites, like sulfites that come from the soil, or those produced by yeasts during alcoholic fermentation. Wines labeled "100% Organic", "Organic", "Made With Organic Grapes", "Made With Organic and Non-Organic Grapes" or without organic certification may contain sulfites, and must disclose this on the label. This also means that the so called "Natural" wine can also contain sulfites. Different rules might apply in different continents.

Histamine 

Histamine is present in a variety of fermented products such as wine, aged cheeses, and sauerkraut. Red wine has 20–200% more histamine on average than white wine, and those who react to it may be deficient in the enzyme diamine oxidase. Experts believe that in some individuals, alcohol consumption may lead to elevated plasma histamine levels even in the absence of histamines in the beverage consumed. A study of 16 people with an intolerance to red wine found no difference in reactions to low and high histamine wines.  Other biogenic amines may also have an effect.

Prostaglandins 

RWH could be caused by the release of prostaglandins which some people are not able to metabolize.  Prostaglandins are substances that can contribute to pain and swelling. Ibuprofen, paracetamol and aspirin are prostaglandin inhibitors. Aspirin and ibuprofen were shown to be effective at blocking both early and late stages of the RWH, and paracetamol was effective in blocking the early stage.

See also

Alcohol flush reaction
Browning in red wine
Food intolerance
Headache
Histamine intolerance
Wine and health
Wine fault

References

Headaches
Health effects of alcohol
Wine